Chinna Gadhili is a neighbourhood in Visakhapatnam, Andhra Pradesh, India. It borders the neighbourhoods of Hanumanthavaka and Arilova. In 2016, the government of Andhra Pradesh named the area "Health City" with many corporate hospitals, including Apollo Hospitals, Q1 Hospitals, Navya Green Hills Hospitals and Pinnacle Hospitals.

The hilltop park Kailasagiri can be found close to this neighbourhood.

References

Neighbourhoods in Visakhapatnam